Andrew Trim (born 30 December 1968 in Sydney, New South Wales) is an Australian flatwater canoeist who competed from the early 1990s to the early 2000s (decade). Competing in three Summer Olympics, he won two medals in the K-2 500 m event with a silver in 2000 and a bronze in 1996, with canoeing partner Daniel Collins.

Trim and Collins also won two medals in the K-2 500 m event at the ICF Canoe Sprint World Championships with a gold in 1997 and a bronze in 1999. He was an Australian Institute of Sport scholarship for the periods 1989–1990, 1992 and 1995–1996.

He entered into real estate, serving as principal of Johnson Real Estate in Birkdale. Trim later became a member of the Liberal National Party and candidate in the 2006 Queensland State Election  for the state seat of Cleveland. Trim lost to the new Labor Party candidate, Phil Weightman.

References

DatabaseOlympics.com profile

1968 births
Australian Institute of Sport canoeists
Australian male canoeists
Canoeists at the 1992 Summer Olympics
Canoeists at the 1996 Summer Olympics
Canoeists at the 2000 Summer Olympics
Living people
Olympic canoeists of Australia
Olympic silver medalists for Australia
Olympic bronze medalists for Australia
Sportspeople from Sydney
Olympic medalists in canoeing
ICF Canoe Sprint World Championships medalists in kayak
Medalists at the 2000 Summer Olympics
Medalists at the 1996 Summer Olympics
20th-century Australian people